Lokmanya is an Indian Marathi language historical biopic series. It starred Kshitish Date and Spruha Joshi in lead roles. It is produced under the banner of Dashami Creations. The show premiered from 21 December 2022 airing Wednesday to Saturday on Zee Marathi.

Cast

Main 
 Kshitish Date as Bal Gangadhar Tilak (Lokmanya)
 Neil Deshpande as younger Balwant Tilak
 Spruha Joshi as Satyabhama Balwant Tilak (Tapi)
 Maithili Patwardhan as younger Bhama Tilak

Recurring 
 Suyash Tilak as Vasudev Balwant Phadke
 Ambar Ganpule as Gopal Ganesh Agarkar
 Vaikhari Pathak-Bhajan as Gopika Tilak
 Rugved Phadake as Daji Aaba Khare
 Aarti More as Yashoda Gopal Agarkar
 Vighnesh Joshi
 Rajashri Nikam

Reception

Special episode

1 hour 
 19 February 2023
 19 March 2023

2 hours 
 22 January 2023 (elder Lokmanya)

References

External links 
 Lokmanya at ZEE5
 
Marathi-language television shows
2022 Indian television series debuts
Zee Marathi original programming